Anne Wahl (born August 25, 1953) is a Norwegian sprint canoer who competed in the mid-1980s. At the 1984 Summer Olympics in Los Angeles, she finished sixth in the K-4 500 m event and seventh in the K-2 500 m event.

References
Sports-Reference.com profile

1953 births
Canoeists at the 1984 Summer Olympics
Living people
Norwegian female canoeists
Olympic canoeists of Norway